This is a list of Texas Longhorns baseball seasons. The Texas Longhorns baseball program is a college baseball team that represents the University of Texas in the Big 12 Conference in the National Collegiate Athletic Association. The Longhorns have played their home games at UFCU Disch–Falk Field in Austin, Texas, since 1974.  

The Longhorns have won 6 College World Series titles, tied for second most nationally, and have reached the ultimate event an unprecedented 37 times, more than any other program.  They have appeared in the NCAA Division I baseball tournament 60 times, also the most of any program. Texas also holds the records for most individual CWS games won (88) and most overall NCAA Tournament games won (248). It is the winningest program in college baseball history, and boasts 79 conference regular season championships, and 16 conference tournament championships. 

Because it leads the collegiate record books in most categories, Texas is often considered one of the best and most iconic programs in college baseball history.

Season results

Notes

References

 
Texas
Texas Longhorns baseball seasons